George Matthew Keller (December 3, 1923 – October 17, 2008) was the chairman of Standard Oil Company of California ("SoCal") in the 1980s, where he oversaw its merger with Gulf Oil to form Chevron Corporation in 1984.

Life and career
Keller was born on December 3, 1923, in Kansas City, Missouri. After his mother died while Keller was a youngster, he was raised by an aunt who fostered an interest in science. He developed a strong fascination with chemistry after visiting the DuPont exhibit at the Century of Progress World's Fair in Chicago in 1933.

Keller enrolled at the Massachusetts Institute of Technology and ultimately graduated from the school in 1948. He left the school as a sophomore and enlisted in the United States Army Air Corps, serving as a meteorologist in Labrador. He chose a position at Standard Oil Company of California in San Francisco after graduation.

At Standard Oil, Keller's specialty was designing refineries. He rose through the ranks and had assignments that included the first discovery of oil in Saudi Arabia, made in 1938, for which Keller received a replica of the sword of Mohammed as a gift.

Keller became chairman of Standard Oil in 1981, succeeding Harold J. Haynes as chairman and chief executive officer. As the company's head, Keller fostered an informal management style and a more aggressive approach to risk.

In 1984, Keller and SoCal were caught in a bidding war with T. Boone Pickens over Gulf Oil. Keller had originally been reluctant to join the wave of mergers spreading through the industry based on his analysis that the firm could acquire new oil reserves at lower cost through exploration and drilling, rather than by purchasing competitors. After a detailed analysis of Gulf Oil's financial records, Keller and his team came up with a price of $79 per share. Keller upped the bid to $80 per share at the last minute, providing the margin that won Gulf in an acquisition valued at $13.3 billion. Though the deal added significantly to the firm's debt load, it was able to double the combined firm's oil reserves, with most of the cost covered by the sale of assets that had been part of Gulf Oil.

In August 1988, Chevron named Kenneth T. Derr as chairman to succeed Keller, who would be reaching the mandatory retirement age of 65. Keller was to leave office as of January 1, 1989.

Later in life he became a prolific San Francisco Bay Area philanthropist.  Including serving on the board of trustees for the College of Notre Dame (now Notre Dame de Namur University) in Belmont, California. He died from complications of orthopedic surgery at Stanford University Hospital near his home in San Mateo in 2008.

Mr. Keller's son, Bill, (born January 18, 1949) is the former Executive Editor of The New York Times.

References

1923 births
2008 deaths
American chief executives
American chemical engineers
Massachusetts Institute of Technology alumni
Chevron Corporation people
United States Army Air Forces soldiers